Alfred Wallace MacLeod (born March 10, 1956) is a Canadian politician. He represented the electoral district of Sydney River-Mira-Louisbourg in the Nova Scotia House of Assembly. He is a member of the Progressive Conservatives.

Before politics
MacLeod was born in Sydney, Nova Scotia in 1956. From 1976 to 1995, he worked a variety of positions with the Cape Breton Development Corporation.

Political career
MacLeod was first elected in an October 1995 by-election in Cape Breton West. He was defeated by Liberal Russell MacKinnon when he ran for re-election in 1998.

In the 2000 federal election, MacLeod was the Progressive Conservative candidate in the electoral district of Bras d'Or—Cape Breton. He lost to Liberal Rodger Cuzner, finishing second, ahead of NDP incumbent Michelle Dockrill.

MacLeod returned to provincial politics in 2006, defeating former Liberal MLA Russell MacKinnon for the Progressive Conservative nomination in Cape Breton West, then winning the seat in the 2006 general election. On October 25, 2007, MacLeod was elected Speaker of the Nova Scotia House of Assembly.

MacLeod was re-elected in the 2009, 2013 and 2017 elections.

On May 14, 2019, MacLeod announced he was seeking the Conservative nomination in Cape Breton—Canso for the 2019 federal election. He was named the candidate in June 2019. MacLeod resigned his provincial seat on July 31, 2019. He was defeated in the federal election.

Personal life
Married to the former Shirley MacDonald; they have three children.

Electoral record

Federal

Provincial

|-

|Progressive Conservative
|Alfie MacLeod
|align="right"|4,178
|align="right"|43.75
|align="right"|
|-

|Liberal
|Josephine Kennedy
|align="right"|3,798
|align="right"|39.77
|align="right"|
|-

|New Democratic Party
|Delton McDonald
|align="right"|1,573
|align="right"|16.47
|align="right"|
|}

|-
 
|Progressive Conservative
|Alfie MacLeod
|align="right"|3,986 
|align="right"|43.88
|align="right"|
|-
 
|New Democratic Party
|Delton MacDonald
|align="right"|2,750
|align="right"|30.28
|align="right"|
|-

|Liberal
|Josephine Kennedy
|align="right"|2,206
|align="right"|24.29
|align="right"|
|-

|}

|-
 
|Progressive Conservative
|Alfie MacLeod
|align="right"|4,729
|align="right"|53.76
|align="right"|
|-

|Liberal
|Dave LeBlanc
|align="right"|2,488
|align="right"|28.28
|align="right"|
|-
 
|New Democratic Party
|Terry Crawley
|align="right"|1,344
|align="right"|15.28
|align="right"|
|-

|}

|-

|Liberal
|Russell MacKinnon
|align="right"|4,528
|align="right"|
|align="right"|
|-
 
|New Democratic Party
|Brian C. Stanley
|align="right"|2,933
|align="right"|
|align="right"|
|-
 
|Progressive Conservative
|Alfie MacLeod
|align="right"|2,818
|align="right"|
|align="right"|
|}

References

External links
 Members of the Nova Scotia Legislative Assembly
 PC caucus profile

1956 births
Living people
Progressive Conservative Association of Nova Scotia MLAs
Speakers of the Nova Scotia House of Assembly
Nova Scotia candidates for Member of Parliament
People from Sydney, Nova Scotia
Conservative Party of Canada candidates for the Canadian House of Commons
Progressive Conservative Party of Canada candidates for the Canadian House of Commons
Candidates in the 2000 Canadian federal election
21st-century Canadian politicians